Seraphin Mugabo (born 8 February 1968) is a Rwandan long-distance runner. He competed in the men's 5000 metres at the 1992 Summer Olympics.

References

1968 births
Living people
Athletes (track and field) at the 1992 Summer Olympics
Rwandan male long-distance runners
Olympic athletes of Rwanda
Place of birth missing (living people)